Juanita is a ghost town in Archuleta County in southwest Colorado.

References 

Former populated places in Archuleta County, Colorado
Ghost towns in Colorado